East Barnet Valley was a local government district from 1863 to 1965 around the town of East Barnet. It was partly in the counties of Hertfordshire and Middlesex until 1889, when the Middlesex part was transferred to Hertfordshire. It was renamed East Barnet in 1935.

Creation
The district was created under the Local Government Act 1858 on 25 September 1863, as East Barnet Valley Local Government District. The district was governed by a local board. Apart from the parish of East Barnet, the local board's area included parts of the surrounding parishes of Chipping Barnet in Hertfordshire and Enfield, Monken Hadley and South Mimms in Middlesex.

Reform
In 1889 Middlesex was reduced locally by the Local Government Act 1888: East Barnet Valley became entirely part of Hertfordshire.

The Local Government Act 1894 reconstituted the local board's area as an urban district, governed by East Barnet Valley Urban District Council. The urban district consisted of three civil parishes, shown below with their area in 1901:

East Barnet (1,697 acres)
Barnet Vale (the area formerly in Chipping Barnet parish) (279 acres)
Monken Hadley (the parts formerly in Middlesex) (668 acres)

The urban district was renamed East Barnet in 1935.

The district formed part of a long, thin protrusion into Middlesex and was surrounded by that county on three sides; to the north, east and south.

Coat of arms
The urban district council adopted an unofficial coat of arms consisting of a shield bearing crossed swords between a red rose of Lancaster and a white rose of York and the Greek letter omega. This design represented the Battle of Barnet, the final battle in the Wars of the Roses. The chief or top third of the shield showed a fleur de lys between two flory crosses, emblems of St Mary, the patron saint of the ancient parish of East Barnet. In 1955 this became the basis for an official grant from the College of Arms. A crest was added above the shield: a hart from the arms of Hertfordshire County Council, with a shield hanging from the neck bearing the cross of St Alban for the historical associations of  the Abbey of St Albans with the area. The motto adopted: Willingness Rids Way, was from Shakespeare's Henry VI, Part 3. It comes from a speech made by Edward IV following the Battle of Barnet.

Abolition
In 1965 the urban district was abolished by the London Government Act 1963 and its former area transferred from Hertfordshire to Greater London . Its former area was combined with that of other districts to form the present-day London Borough of Barnet.

Population
The population, as returned at the census, was:

Politics
The urban district was divided into seven wards for elections: Brunswick Park, Cockfosters, East Barnet, Hadley, Lyonsdown, New Barnet and Osidge.

Urban District council

Parliament constituency
For elections to Parliament, the urban district was part of the constituency of:
Mid or St Albans Division of Hertfordshire
In 1945 St Albans was divided as an emergency measure because its electorate exceeded 100,000 voters, with the urban district becoming part of the new constituency of:
Barnet

Gallery

References

Districts abolished by the London Government Act 1963
Districts of England created by the Local Government Act 1894
Local Government Districts created by the Local Government Act 1858
History of the London Borough of Barnet
History of Hertfordshire
History of local government in London (1889–1965)
Urban districts of England
East Barnet
Local government in Hertfordshire